William Landon Jones (1906–1982) known as "Gorilla" Jones, was an American boxer who held the NBA Middleweight Boxing Championship of the World. Although he was nicknamed "Gorilla" for his exceptional reach, Jones is to be distinguished from the original "Gorilla Jones", who campaigned from 1913 to 1924 and held the World Colored Welterweight title. Jones was never knocked out.  He had 52 knockouts out of his 101 wins, with over 141 total fights. He was posthumously inducted into World Boxing Hall of Fame in 1994 and the International Boxing Hall of Fame in 2009.

Early life and career 
Jones was born in Memphis, Tennessee, on May 12, 1906. He dropped out of school and eventually started boxing at age 18.

Jones turned professional in 1923 with Stephen "Suey" Welch as manager and trained with Joe Stanley.

Jack McVey fell to Jones on June 25, 1929, in a ten-round points decision at Boston's Braves Field before a substantial depression era crowd of 7,000. More of the fighting appeared to take place at long range, with Jones' right connecting most often, as his left was often blocked by McVey's glove. McVey's consistent aggressiveness appeared to turn the crowd in his favor, and he scored on occasion with a few left hooks to the head. The crowd booed the final decision in Jones' favor and resented his presentation of a championship belt from the Massachusetts Boxing Commission.

He lost to Jewish boxer and reigning world welterweight champion Jackie Fields on October 21, 1929, in San Francisco before a crowd of 10,000. In an action-filled ten rounds, Jones took the early lead and rocked Fields several times with straight rights to the jaw, but Fields's stamina and aggressiveness wore Jones down in the closing rounds. Fields clearly took the ninth and tenth, and had a clear edge in five rounds, but could not defend against repeated rights from Jones throughout the bout.  In a match two months later on December 13,  referee Joe O'Connor stopped the bout, complaining that Jones was not giving his "usual exhibition" and ordered the promoter to pay the purses for both fighters.  The Boston Globe felt the fight was legitimate, however, and that Jones's long arms against Fields's desire to fight at close range made the boxers look as though they were trying to avoid coming to blows.

World middleweight tournament, 1931 
On August 25, 1931, Jones defeated Tiger Thomas in a ten-round points decision in Milwaukee, in what several boxing historians would later consider a world middleweight championship bout.  The bout, however, was only the first round in a tournament to determine the world middleweight champion to replace Mickey Walker.  Jones showed superior speed and took a strong points margin, despite a slow start in the first few rounds.  He showed better speed and superior ring craft than his opponent.

In the second round of the NBA middleweight tournament, Jones defeated Clyde Chastain in a sixth-round technical knockout on September 17, 1931.  A cut above Chastain's eye caused by the lace of Jones' glove played no small part in the referee's decision to end the bout in the sixth. Jones had the advantage in three rounds, Chastain in only one, and one was even.

In a ten-round points decision in Milwaukee, Jones defeated George Nichols on November 3, 1931, in the third round of the world middleweight tournament.  Though Nichols was the aggressor throughout the early rounds, Jones' great defensive work kept him out of trouble.  From the fourth to seventh, Jones acted as the aggressor building up a points lead.  Nichols did little damage to Jones until the seventh, landed two strong blows to the body in the ninth, and continued his offensive in the tenth, but Jones' points margin was too great to overcome.  Jones was able to coast through much of the eighth and ninth, though the tenth saw both boxers trying for a knockout.  The crowd of 3,500 did not find the decision entirely to their liking.

Taking the world middleweight championship, January 1932 
He won the National Boxing Association World Middleweight Title vacated by Mickey Walker with a technical knockout over Oddone Piazza on January 25, 1932, in Milwaukee, Wisconsin. The match was the final round of the championship tournament to decide the new world middleweight champion. With hard rights to the head and body in the third, Jones finished the series with two hard blows to the body and one to the head indicating he was close to ending the bout.  In the sixth, Jones pounded Piazza with everything he had, when a solid right put Piazza on the canvas for a count of four.  When he arose, he tried to cover up when Jones continued to pound at him, but the referee wisely stopped the bout.

On March 31, 1932, Jones defeated powerful hitter, Chuck Burns in a third-round knockout in Akron, Ohio. Jones floored Burns three times in the third with a flock of lefts and rights, before sending him to the mat for the fourth and final time. Burns had not been knocked out in a previous bout. The first two rounds were slow as Jones assessed his opponent, but he came out roaring in the third.

In a world middleweight title defense, Jones defeated Young Terry on April 26, 1932, in a twelve-round unanimous points decision before a partisan crowd of 7,000 rooting for Terry, at the Armory in Trenton, New Jersey. A right to the heart and a short left to the chin made Terry's knees nearly crumble in the eighth, but he avoided a knockout. Terry made Jones miss on occasion, but Jones dominated throughout the bout, took the offensive, and showed better ringcraft in the well fought bout.

Losing the world middleweight championship, June 1932 
Jones lost the belt later that year on June 11 in Paris, to Frenchman Marcel Thil from an eleventh round disqualification.  The New York Times wrote that Jones was losing on points when he was disqualified after having been warned for holding and hitting low. The crowd of 70,000 was the largest to attend a prize fight in Paris for years.

On April 19, 1933, Jones fought a six-round no contest against Jewish boxer Ben Jeby, reigning world middlweight champion, before a crowd of 8,000 at Public Hall in Cleveland, Ohio. The referee stopped the bout because of a lack of effort from both fighters.

Taking the American middleweight championship, January 1933 
Jones won the American Middleweight Championship in a seventh-round knockout against Sammy Slaughter on January 30, 1933, in Cleveland.  The title was recognized by the National Boxing Association, but was a national and not a world title, as some reporters later claimed.  In the second through sixth, Jones either gained a margin or coasted waiting to strike a telling blow against his opponent.  In the fifth and sixth, Slaughter reached Jones' face with high overhand rights which affected the judges' scoring more than Jones. Finally in the sixth, Jones ended the bout with a right to the nose, and a hard right to the jaw, followed by a lighter side blow to the jaw that put Slaughter down for the count.

Final attempt at world middleweight championship, January 1937 
On New Year's Day 1937, he took on Freddie Steele, the National Boxing Association World Middleweight and NYSAC World Middleweight Title holder, in a title match, but lost in a tenth round unanimous decision. Before a disappointing crowd of 4,000, Steele scored repeatedly with long lefts and right crosses to the head. After a left to the face, Steele dropped Jones in the third with a crushing right to the chin, but Jones was up quickly. From the fourth through the tenth, Steele was the aggressor and built a comfortable points margin.  Steele was awarded all but one round from Jones, who took only the second.  Jones had previously lost to Steele on September 17, 1935, in a ten-round uanimous decision in Seattle.  On May 22, 1934, the two had fought a ten-round decision on points in Seattle.

On August 9, 1937, Jones defeated former world welterweight champion Tommy Freeman in a ten-round points decision in Council Bluffs, Iowa.  In a slow feature bout, Jones took most of the offensive from the third round on.

Jones lost to former middleweight champion Babe Risko on May 10, 1938, in a ten-round points decision in Akron, Ohio, before a modest crowd of 1,538. Jones was tagged repeatedly by Risko, a heavier boxer with a longer reach. Risko's left jab, which frequently led to following rights was a problem for Jones throughout the bout though he took a number of rounds in the close bout. Jones took quite a beating in the fifth, and performed his best in the seventh, though Risko had enough points to use his left jab for defense to coast a bit in the final two rounds.

His last win was two years later on January 24, 1939, against Angelo Puglisi, a ten-round points decision in Seattle. After his last fight, a loss to Vern Earling on May 29, 1940, he retired from boxing.  Jones was already beginning to have mild vision problems from cataracts.

Life and work after boxing 
Jones performed some training duties from the mid- to late 1940s until the 1970s, working with Milo Savage, Johnny Wells, Irish Bob Murphy, and later with Suey Welch's boxer Gil King during the early 1970s. Jones served in WWII. In the 1950s, he taught boxing at the Boys Club in Watts. After the war, he worked for Mae West, whom he had known since he was 22, becoming her boyfriend, chauffeur and bodyguard. West was his employer, friend and supporter until her death in 1980. Jones suffered from failing eyesight in his later years from diabetes. He was also among many boxers who attended the funeral of Feab S. Williams (better known as "George Godfrey").

Death 
Jones died from arteriosclerosis and diabetes at his home near McArthur Park on January 4, 1982, in Los Angeles, California, at the age of 75.  He was buried in Evergreen Cemetery in East Los Angeles.

Professional boxing record
All information in this section is derived from BoxRec, unless otherwise stated.

Official record

All newspaper decisions are officially regarded as “no decision” bouts and are not counted in the win/loss/draw column.

Unofficial record

Record with the inclusion of newspaper decisions in the win/loss/draw column.

References

External links
 

|-

 

1906 births
1982 deaths
Boxers from Tennessee
Middleweight boxers
World middleweight boxing champions
Sportspeople from Memphis, Tennessee
American male boxers